Johan Andreas (Anders) Murray (27 January 1740 – 22 May 1791) was a Swedish physician of German descent and botanist, who published a major work on plant-derived medicines.

Biography

Johan Anders Murray was born in Stockholm on 27 January 1740, son of the Prussian-born preacher and theologian Andreas Murray (1695 - 1771).
His brothers were the professors Johann Philipp Murray (1726-1776) and Adolph Murray (1751-1803), 
and the Bishop Gustaf Murray (1747-1825).

Murray studied from 1756-1759 in Uppsala, where he was taught by Carl Linnaeus. In 1760, he went to Göttingen, where he became a doctor of medicine in 1763. In 1769, he was appointed professor and director of the botanical garden.
He led investigations into the properties of medicinal plants, at that time the main interest of botanists, and into the ways in which plant-derived medicines could be prepared and administered.

In 1791, Murray was elected a member of the American Philosophical Society. Murray died in Göttingen on 22 May 1791.

Work

Murray was a prominent pharmacologist and botanist. His work  (1776–92) in six volumes, of which the last was published only after his death, is a comprehensive compilation of herbal remedies.

In addition, he published German translations of numerous writings by Swedish physicians. 
In 1774 he published the 13th edition of Linnaeus's  under the title  (‘System of the Vegetable Kingdom’), with an introduction he wrote himself called  (‘The Vegetable Kingdom’). The standard botanical abbreviation for this is Syst. Veg.. A fourteenth edition was published in 1784.

Legacy 
The citrus genus Murraya is named for Johan Andreas Murray.

Partial bibliography

Murray was the author of many treatises and translations, which included:

Digital edition by the University and State Library Düsseldorf

 
 
 15th edition 1797

References
Citations

Sources

1740 births
1791 deaths
18th-century Swedish physicians
Swedish botanists
Physicians from Stockholm
Swedish people of German descent